Eva Bartoňová (born 17 October 1993) is a Czech football midfielder, currently playing for Sparta Prague in the Czech Women's First League. Bartoňová was voted talent of the year at the 2008 Czech Footballer of the Year (women).

She is a member of the Czech national team. She made her debut for the national team on 26 November 2010 in a match against Hungary.

References

1993 births
Living people
Czech women's footballers
Czech Republic women's international footballers
People from Jilemnice
Women's association football midfielders
SK Slavia Praha (women) players
AC Sparta Praha (women) players
Inter Milan (women) players
Expatriate women's footballers in Italy
Czech expatriate sportspeople in Italy
Czech Women's First League players
Serie A (women's football) players
Sportspeople from the Liberec Region